The Estonian National Road Race Championship is a road bicycle race that takes place inside the Estonian National Cycling Championship, and decides the best cyclist in this type of race. The first edition took place in 1994, and was won by Andres Lauk. Jaan Kirsipuu holds the record for the most wins in the men's championship with 5, while Grete Treier holds the record for most wins in the women's championship with 5 wins. The current champions are Mihkel Räim and Aidi Gerde Tuisk.

Multiple winners

Men

Women

Men

Elite

Women

Elite

References

External links
Past winners on cyclingarchives.com

National road cycling championships
Cycle races in Estonia
Recurring sporting events established in 1994
1994 establishments in Estonia
Road